Brenno Oliveira Fraga Costa (born 1 April 1999), simply known as Brenno, is a Brazilian professional footballer who plays as a goalkeeper for Grêmio.

Professional career
A youth product of Desportivo Brasil, Brenno signed with Grêmio in 2017. Brenno made his professional debut with Grêmio in a 1-0 Campeonato Gaúcho win over Internacional on 17 March 2019.

On 17 June 2021, Brenno was named in the Brazil squad for the 2020 Summer Olympics.

Career statistics

Honours

Club
Grêmio
Recopa Sudamericana: 2018
Campeonato Gaúcho: 2018, 2019, 2020, 2021, 2022
Recopa Gaúcha: 2019, 2021, 2022

International
Brazil Olympic
Summer Olympics: 2020

References

External links
  Grêmio Official Profile

1999 births
Living people
People from Sorocaba
Brazilian footballers
Association football goalkeepers
Campeonato Brasileiro Série A players
Campeonato Brasileiro Série B players
Grêmio Foot-Ball Porto Alegrense players
Olympic footballers of Brazil
Footballers at the 2020 Summer Olympics
Olympic medalists in football
Olympic gold medalists for Brazil
Medalists at the 2020 Summer Olympics
Footballers from São Paulo (state)